A Norseman is a member of a North Germanic ethnolinguistic group of the Early Middle Ages.

Norseman may also refer to:

 Norseman, Western Australia
 Norseman Gold Mine, a gold mine in Western Australia
 Noorduyn Norseman, a piston-engine airplane
 Norseman triathlon, a long distance triathlon sports competition
 The Norseman, a 1978 American film starring Lee Majors
 The Norseman, a fictional device created by Alexei Volkoff in the TV series Chuck
 Norsemen (TV series), a 2016–2020 Norwegian comedy series

See also

 
 
 Norse (disambiguation)
 Northman (disambiguation)
 Northmen (disambiguation)